Quan Gomes (born 5 January 1996) is an Indian professional footballer who plays as a midfielder for Churchill Brothers in the I-League.

Career
Quan has represented Fransa-Pax FC U-14 and Betalbatim sporting club U-14, before joining Salgaocar F.C. U-16 where he got an opportunity to play in Thailand after winning the India leg of the Manchester United Premier Cup Under-15 competition. He also played for Guardian Angel SC, Curchorem in the GFA First Division League. Quan had previously for Dempo S.C. U-18 and also in the Goa Professional League for Vasco S.C.

He made his professional debut for the Churchill Brothers against Punjab F.C. on 1 December 2019, He was brought in the 90th minutes as Churchill Brothers won 3–0.

Career statistics

Club

References

1996 births
Living people
People from Margao
Indian footballers
Indian Arrows players
Footballers from Goa
I-League players
Association football midfielders
East Bengal Club players
Salgaocar FC players
Dempo SC players
Sporting Clube de Goa players
Vasco SC players
Churchill Brothers FC Goa players